The 1937 World Table Tennis Championships women's singles was the 11th edition of the women's singles championship.
Ruth Aarons and Gertrude Pritzi competed in the final which ended in an anticlimax because both players were stopped from finishing the final under the new time limit rules and declared joint champions.

Results

+ match ended under time limit rules

See also
List of World Table Tennis Championships medalists

References

-
-